Angel of the Lord is an entity appearing repeatedly in the Old Testament

Angel of the Lord may also refer to:

 Angel of the Lord (film), 2005 Czech film
 Angel of the Lord 2, 2016 Czech film